Cesare de' Giacomelli (died 1577) was a Roman Catholic prelate who served as Bishop of Belcastro (1553–1577).

Biography
On 23 January 1553, Cesare de' Giacomelli was appointed during the papacy of Pope Julius III as Bishop of Belcastro.  He served as Bishop of Belcastro until his death in 1577 in Rome.

While bishop, he was the principal consecrator of Feliciano Capitone, Archbishop of Avignon (1566); and the principal co-consecrator of Giovanni Battista Ansaldo, Bishop of Cariati e Cerenzia (1576), and Giovanni Bernardino Grandopoli, Bishop of Lettere-Gragnano (1576).

References

External links and additional sources
 (for Chronology of Bishops) 
 (for Chronology of Bishops) 

16th-century Italian Roman Catholic bishops
Bishops appointed by Pope Julius III
1577 deaths